Eulithosia composita is a moth of the family Noctuidae first described by Henry Edwards in 1884. It is found in North America, including Arizona and western Texas.

References

Hadeninae
Moths described in 1884